Sim Sung-chol (born 20 March 1976) is a North Korean former footballer. He represented North Korea on at least ten occasions between 2004 and 2005.

Career statistics

International

References

1976 births
Living people
North Korean footballers
North Korea international footballers
Association football goalkeepers
April 25 Sports Club players